The Netherlands Football League Championship 1894–1895 was contested by six teams from the cities Amsterdam, The Hague, Haarlem, Rotterdam and Wageningen. The teams participated in the competition that would later be called Eerste Klasse West. But since the western football district of the Netherlands was the only one to have a competition at the time, it could be regarded as a national championship. This was also the reason that Go Ahead Wageningen participated, as they would later play in the eastern division. Koninklijke HFC won the championship.

New entrant
 Rapiditas Rotterdam

League standings

References
RSSSF Eerste Klasse West
RSSSF Netherlands Football League Championships 1898-1954

Netherlands Football League Championship seasons